"Ridin'" is a song by American singer Mya. It was written and composed by Mýa, Ester Dean, Jevon Simms, Traci Hale and Tricky Stewart for her fourth studio album Liberation (2007), with the latter serving as producer. The lyric of the R&B song is based on a personal experience Mýa endured in a relationship at one point in time when she suspected her ex-boyfriend of cheating, finding herself at her lowest point, while chasing him and his affair.

The song was released by Universal Motown as a single in favor over album cuts "I Am" and "Walka Not a Talka" in a poll on Mya's MySpace page voted by fans and after the commercial disappointment of previous single "Lock U Down". Upon release, it received generally positive reviews from contemporary music critics, who complimented on Mya's toned of voice and the topic of the song. A minor success on Billboards Hot R&B/Hip-Hop Songs chart, it peaked at number fifty-eight. The song's accompanying music video was filmed by Erik White.

Background
"Ridin'" was written by Mýa along with Ester Dean, Jevon Simms, Traci Hale and Tricky Stewart, while production was helmed by the latter. The autobiographical song was inspired by a toxic relationship with a New York-based record producer whom Mýa found cheating after she had moved to Los Angeles to record her third studio album Moodring there. In a 2007 interview with Vibe Vixen she commented: "I became my own private investigator. I found the chick's address; I went riding by. I was calling her cell phone to if he would be in the background. I had her work number, all that." Citing it her "lowest point," she felt encouraged to write a song about her "feeling of helplessness and desperation" in that situation, telling Vibe: "I never, never want to be that woman again, but it happens to a lot of us. I felt like I was playing myself following this dude and hiring this private investigator, just going crazy [...] I was scared to write about these kinds of things before."

Critical reception

In reviewing Ridin', Mark Edward Nero of About.com noted that "stylistically, it's very similar to some songs on Usher's Confessions album, with the major difference being Mýa playing the cheated-on role instead of the cheater." Vibes Julianne Shepherd called "Ridin'" a "mean jeep jiggler, in which [Mýa] describes scouring the city at 4 a.m. — 'past your ex-bitch's house' — to find her man.  She sounds like she's clutching a dagger between her teeth on the track."

Music video
A music video for "Ridin'" was directed by Erik White. It premiered on BET's music video show 106 & Park on September 7, 2007.

Track listing
All tracks produced by Christopher "Tricky" Stewart.

Credits and personnel
Credits lifted from the liner notes of Liberation.

 

Ester Dean – writer
Traci C. Hale – writer
Mýa Harrison – vocalist, writer
 
Jevon Sims – writer
Christopher "Tricky" Stewart – producer, writer

Chart

Release history

References

2007 singles
Mýa songs
Songs written by Tricky Stewart
Songs written by Traci Hale
Songs written by Mýa
Songs written by Ester Dean
Song recordings produced by Tricky Stewart
Music videos directed by Erik White
2007 songs
Universal Motown Records singles